is a Japanese football player. He plays for Arterivo Wakayama.

Playing career
Ryu Miyamoto joined to J3 League club; Gainare Tottori in 2015. In 2016, he moved to Arterivo Wakayama.

References

External links

1992 births
Living people
Doshisha University alumni
Association football people from Osaka Prefecture
Japanese footballers
J3 League players
Gainare Tottori players
Association football midfielders